, also known as Crystal Lord Opera, is a Japanese fantasy manga series written and illustrated by Keiko Takemiya. It was serialized in Kadokawa Shoten's monthly  manga magazine Asuka from 1991 to 2000, with its chapters collected in 24  volumes.

Plot
The manga is set in 12th-century Mongolia, in the time of Genghis Khan. It follows Altojin, a determined girl warrior with a mysterious tattoo.

One day she goes on a hunting trip with the Prince Olsbolt and saves him from an assassination attempt. Prince Olsbolt thinks the assassin was sent by his father, who is also the ruler of Chigul. He decides to kill his father, and in doing so he also takes back his former lover, who had been married to his father. After killing his father the khan, Olsbolt hides at Altojin's house. A dramatic event happens. While they are out for a while, Altojin's family is slaughtered.

It is up to the reader to discover the fate of Altojin and Prince Olsbolt, and what role the mysterious tattoo plays in the story.

Characters

A determined girl warrior who was raised in the grassland plains of Chigul. Although she was abandoned as a child, she is in fact of royal descent.

The Prince of Chigul and the son of the ruling sovereign, Bilge Khan.

Prince Olsbolt's half-brother.

The King of Palmis, said to be the country of merchants.

A shrine princess and the twin sister of Sihel.

The twin sister of Ratuya.

The khan of Chigul.

Publication
 was written and illustrated by Keiko Takemiya. It was serialized in Kadokawa Shoten's monthly  manga magazine Asuka, starting in the January 1991 issue. It concluded in the magazine's January–February 2000 issue. The series was collected in 24  or trade paperback volumes published by Kadokawa Shoten's Asuka Comics imprint from 1991 to 2000. Its early chapters were also collected in a three-volume omnibus edition published by the company's Asuka Comics Deluxe imprint from 1991 to 1992. The complete series was re-released in eight  or "perfect edition" volumes published by Kadokawa Shoten's  Comics imprint in 2003.

References

External links
 Tenma no Ketsuzoku at Baka-Updates Manga

Adventure anime and manga
Comics set in Mongolia
Comics set in the 12th century
Historical fantasy anime and manga
Kadokawa Shoten manga
Shōjo manga